Triad (German: Dreiklang) is a 1938 German drama film directed by Hans Hinrich and starring Lil Dagover, Paul Hartmann and Rolf Moebius.

It was shot at the Babelsberg Studios with sets designed by the art directors Wilhelm Depenau and Ludwig Reiber.

Cast

References

Bibliography 
 Hake, Sabine. Popular Cinema of the Third Reich. University of Texas Press, 2001.

External links 
 

1938 films
Films of Nazi Germany
German drama films
1938 drama films
1930s German-language films
Films directed by Hans Hinrich
German black-and-white films
UFA GmbH films
1930s German films